Chan Shu Kui Memorial School is a secondary school in Yau Yat Chuen, Kowloon, Hong Kong.

A DSS school sponsored by Chan Shu Kui Memorial School School Management Committee Limited, it opened in 1973, and admits both boys and girls.

References

External links
 Chan Shu Kui Memorial School
 Chan Shu Kui Memorial School 

Schools in Kowloon
Secondary schools in Hong Kong
1973 establishments in Hong Kong
Educational institutions established in 1973
Yau Yat Tsuen